Pterogonia aurigutta is a moth of the family Nolidae first described by Francis Walker in 1858. It is found in Sundaland, Singapore, Thailand, the Andaman Islands and Sri Lanka.

Description
It has pale reddish-brown forewings. An angled, dark postmedial fascia is visible. A pale discal spot is found in females.

References

Moths of Asia
Moths described in 1858
Nolidae